Gorps may refer to:

 Gorps (aliens), aliens in the television series Astro Farm
 Gorps (creatures), creatures in the novel series The War Against the Chtorr
 Gorps (musician), a musician in the band Pfuri Gorps & Kniri

See also

 Gorp (disambiguation)
 Gorping